Nesosydne is a genus of true bugs belonging to the family Delphacidae.

The species of this genus are found in Hawaiian Islands.

Species:
 Nesosydne acastus Fennah, 1958 
 Nesosydne agenor Fennah, 1958

References

Delphacidae